Eugen Drăguţescu (1914-1992) was a notable Romanian painter and graphic artist.

References

1914 births
1992 deaths
20th-century Romanian painters